Spa Road in the City of Gloucester runs between the junction of Southgate Street and Llanthony Road in the north and Montpellier in the South. It is joined by Brunswick Road on its north side. It contains a number of listed buildings.

Listed buildings
 117 and 119 Southgate Street (corner of Spa Road)
 2
 3-7
 9 and 11
 11a
 Norfolk House
 Ribston Hall
 Maitland House
 19 & 21
 Sherborne House
 Judges Lodgings
 Beaufort House (corner of Brunswick Road and Spa Road)
 1 Beaufort Buildings
 2, 3, 4 Beaufort Buildings
 5 & 6 Beaufort Buildings
 7 Beaufort Buildings

References

External links 

Streets in Gloucester